Pan American Stadium is the name given to some venues built for the Pan American Games and may refer to the following:

Pan American Stadium (New Orleans), New Orleans
Pan American Stadium (Winnipeg), Winnipeg, Canada
Pan Am and Parapan Am Athletics Stadium, Toronto, Canada
Estadio Panamericano, Havana, Cuba
Estadio Panamericano, San Cristóbal, San Cristóbal, Dominican Republic
Estadio Panamericano de Béisbol, Zapopan, Mexico

See also
Pan Am and Parapan Am Aquatics Centre and Field House, Toronto, Canada
Pan Am Ball Park, Toronto, Canada
Pan Am Field Hockey Centre, Toronto, Canada
Pan Am Pool, Winnipeg, Canada
Pan American Baseball Stadium, Lagos de Moreno, Mexico
Estadio Panamericano de Hockey, Guadalajara, Mexico
Estadio Panamericano de Softbol, Guadalajara, Mexico